Chayalode is a ward situated in the  central Travancore region in the state of Kerala, south India.

Chayalode has a hilly terrain. Rubber estates cover Chayalode. It has a variety of tropical flora and fauna. Chayalode is in Enadimangalam village, Adoor Taluk, Pathanamthitta District, Kerala state, India. Climate Chayalode has a warm, wet, and humid climate year-round. It experiences monsoon rains every June. The primary forms of transportation are bus, car, and auto-rickshaw. The bus service connects Chayalode to Patanapuram and Adoor. The road in Chayalode extends to Pattazhy, Patanapuram, Elamanoor, Ezhamkulam, Mangadu, and Enath.

Culture Notable Events and People History Demographics Religion Politics Schools and Colleges Chayalode History Interview Notes  In 1920, Koshy Yohannan arrived in Chayalode from Chenganur. He saw the land and thought it was good. He purchased 20 acres of land from the Atwasheri family. After 5 years, they settled here. They built a small grass home (pul-mainya) to live in. 7 families lived together here. These were 3 families – Koshy Yohannan, his elder brother, and his younger brother – and 4 families – Koshy Yohannan’s sister and her husband’s 3 brothers. It was uninhabited. They lived in grass homes. From Kilikode Junction to Chayalode, there was no one living. Later, K.G. Cherian arrived in Chayalode after retiring from his job as a high school headmaster and established the Giri Sodhanam family in Chayalode. They owned more than 100 acres of land here. This is where the high school, the Asram, and the medical college now stand. After 15 years, everyone had built stone homes (kal and odde). After building homes, they constructed a road from Kilikode Junction to Chayalode so that cars could pass. Beginning in 1950, people from outside began to settle in Chayalode. In 1954, a LPS school was established. In 1957, every home in Chayalode received electricity, initiated by Sri. Y. Thomas. After a few years, a bus service began between Kayamkulam and Chayalode (stay service), initiated by Sri. Y. Thomas. In the 1970s, Chayalode Post Office was also established. Then, a high school and a reading room were built. Then PWD took over the road, paved it, and added streetlights. The bus service was extended to Patanapuram and Adoor. In 2011, a medical college was started in Chayalode.
Population: 100 families?

Photos

References

Geography of Pathanamthitta district